Janis Graham Jack (born 1946) is a senior United States district judge of the United States District Court for the Southern District of Texas.

Education and career

Jack was born in Los Angeles, California. She received a registered nursing diploma from St. Thomas School of Nursing (part of the University of St. Thomas) in 1969, a Bachelor of Arts degree in sociology from the University of Baltimore in 1974, and a Juris Doctor from South Texas College of Law in 1981. She was in private practice in Corpus Christi, Texas from 1981 to 1993.

Federal judicial service

On November 19, 1993, Jack was nominated by President Bill Clinton to a new seat on the United States District Court for the Southern District of Texas created by 104 Stat. 5089. She was confirmed by the United States Senate on March 10, 1994, and received her commission on March 11, 1994. She assumed senior status on June 1, 2011.

Notable rulings

In June 2005, Jack threw out about 9,000 suits against US Silica corp.

In 2015, Jack ruled in favor of plaintiffs in a class action suit (M.D. v. Abbott) on behalf of 10,000-plus foster children in care of the State of Texas, saying leaders were violating the constitutional rights of the children in its long-term foster care. With much of her ruling sustained on appeal, Jack continues to supervise the case as late as 2022, holding the State in contempt of court and often expressing “disgust“ at the State of Texas’ failure to care for foster children.

References

External links

1946 births
Living people
University of Baltimore alumni
South Texas College of Law alumni
University of St. Thomas (Texas) alumni
Judges of the United States District Court for the Southern District of Texas
United States district court judges appointed by Bill Clinton
People from Los Angeles
20th-century American judges
21st-century American judges
20th-century American women judges
21st-century American women judges
American nurses
American women nurses